Dong Xuan (born 5 November 1979), also known as Michelle Dong, is a Chinese actress and singer best known for her role as Teacher Zhang in And the Spring Comes and has also starred in a number of television series, including Xuehua Nüshenlong (2003), Spring Flower and Autumn Moon (2014), Eight Heroes (2008), Amazing Detective Di Renjie 3 (2008), The Legend of Crazy Monk (2010), The Young Lawyer Ji Xiaolan (2012), and Secret of the Three Kingdoms (2018).

Early life and education
Dong was born in Mudanjiang, Heilongjiang, on November 5, 1982. She began taking piano lessons, violin lessons and dance lessons in her early teens. In 1995 she entered Shenyang Conservatory of Music, majoring in dancing. In 2000 she was accepted to Beijing Film Academy.

Acting career
Dong made her screen debut with a supporting role as Shangguan Yan in Xuehua Nüshenlong (2003).

In 2004, Dong starred opposite Steve Ma in period drama Spring Flower and Autumn Moon.

In 2006, Dong was cast in the historical drama Struggle For Imperial Power'. She then starred in modern drama A Gentleman's Good Mate.

In 2008, Dong played one of the lead roles in wuxia drama in Eight Heroes. She then appeared in Amazing Detective Di Renjie 3, a suspense television series. The same year, she made her film debut with a supporting role in And the Spring Comes, for which she received Best Supporting Actress nomination at the 27th Golden Rooster Awards.

In 2009, Dong joined the main cast of historical drama Guandong Adventure. She then made a cameo appearance in patriotic film The Founding of a Republic.
Dong had a key supporting role in the historical comedy television series A Legend of Shaolin Kung Fu the same year as Ji Xiaolan's love interest.

In 2010, Dong played a supporting role in the shenmo television series The Legend of Crazy Monk. That same year, she starred alongside Du Chun in romance drama Puberty hit Menopause.

In 2011, Dong was cast in her first leading role in the youth film Struggle with Li Chen. In August, she starred in the suspense romance television series Unbeatable. At that same year, she made a guest appearance as Xiang Jingyu on The Founding of a Party.

In 2014, Dong played the role of the founder of Gumu Sect Lin Zhaoying in The Romance of the Condor Heroes, adapted from Jin Yong's wuxia novel The Return of the Condor Heroes.

In 2018, Dong played Diaochan in the historical drama Secret of the Three Kingdoms''.

Personal life
Dong began dating Gao Yunxiang in 2009. They married in Beijing on August 21, 2011. Their daughter, nicknamed Xiao Jiuwo, was born on June 2, 2016. On July 16, 2019, Dong's attorney told reporter of Sina that Dong Xuan and Gao Yunxiang divorced in March 2019.

Filmography

Film

Television series

Discography

Singles

Awards

References

External links
 
 
 Dong Xuan on Chinesemov.com

1982 births
People from Mudanjiang
Living people
Shenyang Conservatory of Music alumni
Beijing Film Academy alumni
21st-century Chinese actresses
Actresses from Heilongjiang
Chinese film actresses
Chinese television actresses